"Heart Association" is a song by R&B group The Emotions released as a single in 1970 on Stax Records. The single reached No. 29 on the Billboard Hot R&B Singles chart.

Overview
"Heart Association" was produced by David Porter and Ronnie Williams. The song was also composed by Vince Willis.

References

1970 songs
1970 singles
The Emotions songs
Stax Records singles